KSV Sanctus Virgilius (also known as Virgiel) is the largest student fraternity/sorority in Delft, named after the Irish born astronomer, geometer and bishop Saint Virgil. There are about 2000 student members (mostly students at TU Delft) who gather together on a daily or weekly basis at an old monastery named Alcuin in the city centre of Delft.

A wide variety of sports and cultural events are organized by members of Virgiel, including football, field hockey, rugby and climbing.

Virgiel was created in 1898 as the result of emancipation of the Catholic youth in the Netherlands. Catholicism had long been repressed by government policy, and Delft Catholic students wanted to unite to discuss their faith and position in society.

After the Second World War, Virgiel quickly grew. In the 1960s it quickly lost much of its religious objective. Virgiel is now a non-faith-based fraternity/sorority, which is primarily aimed at having a good time while also expanding knowledge and views outside class-hours.

See also
Collegium Studiosorum Veritas

Student societies in the Netherlands
Delft University of Technology